Yongin Daejanggeum Park, previously known as MBC Dramia, is an outdoor film set owned by Munhwa Broadcasting Corporation in the city of Yongin in Gyeonggi province, South Korea.

Background
Built in 2005, the site comprises a total area of 2,500,000m2, out of which actual sets take up 165,000 m2, The complex features permanent sets imitating buildings from the Samguk, Goryeo and Joseon periods, and functions as an interactive center for hallyu. Its name MBC Dramia was created from the words drama" and "utopia". historical drama series like Moon Embracing the Sun, Dong Yi and Queen Seondeok were shot there.

The complex was opened to visitors and tourists on June 21, 2011 for the first time.
Recently in 2015, it was renamed to its current name Yongin Daejanggeum Park, based on the titular character of MBC's 2003 historical drama Dae Jang Geum, for promotional reasons.

Series filmed at Yongin MBC Daejanggeum Park

The following TV series were shot at Yongin MBC Daejanggeum Park:
Shin Don (2005)
Jumong (2006)
Yi San (2007)
Queen Seondeok (2009)
Dong Yi (2010)
The Duo (2011)
Gyebaek (2011)
Moon Embracing the Sun (2012)
God of War (2012)
Dr. Jin (2012)
Arang and the Magistrate (2012)
The King's Doctor (2012)
Hur Jun, The Original Story (2013)
Gu Family Book (2013)
Goddess of Fire (2013)
The King's Daughter, Soo Baek-hyang (2014)
Empress Ki (2014)
Triangle (2014)
The Night Watchman's Journal (2014)
Shine or Go Crazy (2015)
Splendid Politics (2015)
Scholar Who Walks the Night (2015)
Splash Splash Love (2015)
Jang Yeong-sil (2016)
Flower of Prison (2016)
The Rebel: Thief Who Stole the People (2017)
The Emperor: Owner of the Mask (2017)
The King in Love (2017)
The Crowned Clown (2019)
Haechi (2019)
Extraordinary You (2019)
Rookie Historian Goo Hae-ryung (2019)
My Country (2019)
Mr. Queen (2020)

Other uses

Music videos
Stray Kids - "Double Knot (English Ver.)" Performance Video  (2020)
Agust D (BTS' Suga) - "Daechwita" (2020)
ONEUS - "가자 (LIT) (Taekwondo Ver.)" Performance Video (2021)
GHOST9 - "Seoul" (2021)
KINGDOM - "승천 (Ascension)" (2022)

Gallery

See also
Daejanggeum Theme Park

References

External links

Official website

Munhwa Broadcasting Corporation
South Korean film studios
Amusement parks in South Korea
Tourist attractions in Gyeonggi Province
Buildings and structures in Gyeonggi Province
Amusement parks opened in 2011
2011 establishments in South Korea